Bulgaria–Palestine relations are the bilateral relations between Bulgaria and Palestine. Diplomatic relations were established in February 1973. Both countries are members of the Union for the Mediterranean. Bulgaria recognized the Palestinian Declaration of Independence issued by the Palestine Liberation Organization (PLO).

History 
In March 2018, President Rumen Radev visited Ramallah and met with President Mahmoud Abbas. Prime Minister Boyko Borisov made an official visit to Palestine in June 2018, meeting with his Palestinian counterpart Rami Hamdallah.

See also  
 Foreign relations of Bulgaria
 Foreign relations of Palestine
 Bulgaria–Israel relations 
 Palestine–European Union relations

References 

Palestine
Bilateral relations of the State of Palestine